Liang Bo (born March 25, 1991), also known as Bruce Liang, is a Chinese pop rock singer-songwriter. He was the champion of the first season of The Voice of China.

Liang was born in Jiutai, Changchun, Jilin in 1991. He completed his undergraduate study at the Popular Music School of Jilin College of the Arts from 2009 to 2013. He also holds a master's degree from Jilin College of the Arts.

Liang's self-titled debut album was released in April, 2014. This album was recorded in the United States and co-produced by Michael Bearden, who is best known as Michael Jackson's final music director. Liang released his second album Mi Cang in November, 2015. Recordings were done in one take.

Liang participated in the television program Singer 2017 as the final challenger of the season and was immediately eliminated for failing the challenge. In the breakout round, he was failed to qualify for the finals.

Discography

Studio albums 
Music/Lyrics: Liang Bo

Singles

Filmography
 In 2014, Liang starred in the documentary Rock On, 20.40.60 directed by Zuxin Hou.

References

1991 births
Living people
Chinese rock singers
Singers from Jilin
Musicians from Changchun
Pop rock singers
Chinese male singer-songwriters
Chinese guitarists
The Voice (franchise) winners
The Voice of China contestants
21st-century guitarists
21st-century Chinese male singers